{{DISPLAYTITLE:C18H21ClN2}}
The molecular formula C18H21ClN2 may refer to:

 Chlorcyclizine
 1-(3-Chlorophenyl)-4-(2-phenylethyl)piperazine (3C-PEP)
 Norclomipramine, also known as N-desmethylclomipramine and chlordesipramine

Molecular formulas